Isfahan Healthcare city is a complex built close to Aghababaei highway, Isfahan, consisting of a hospital with 1000 beds with the goal of earning revenue from medical tourism.  It is in District 10 and built by Municipality of Isfahan with an Italian corporation.

>

See also 

 Economy in Isfahan

References 

Buildings and structures in Isfahan
Infobox mapframe without OSM relation ID on Wikidata
Hospitals in Iran